Decline and fall of the Third Reich may refer to

the Collapse of the Third Reich
Rise and Decline of the Third Reich, a board wargame
Rise and Fall of the Third Reich, a nonfiction book